Lluís Carreras Ferrer (born 24 September 1972) is a Spanish retired footballer who played mostly as a left back but also as a defensive midfielder, currently a manager.

He started his professional career with Barcelona, without much success, and went on to amass La Liga totals of 169 matches and eight goals in representation of six other clubs. He added 149 games and 25 goals in Segunda División, over six seasons.

After retiring, Carreras became a coach and guided Sabadell to promotion to Segunda División in his first full season. After three years there, he also managed Mallorca, Zaragoza and Gimnàstic de Tarragona, all of them in the Spanish second tier.

Playing career
Born in Sant Pol de Mar, Barcelona, Catalonia, Carreras was a product of FC Barcelona's famed youth system, La Masia. He made his first-team debut on 4 April 1993 in a 3–0 home win against CD Logroñés, in what would be his only La Liga match of the season.

After two loans with interesting playing time, at Real Oviedo and Racing de Santander, Carreras returned to Barça. Although he appeared regularly in 1995–96's league, they came out empty in silverware.

Carreras then lived his most steady period at RCD Mallorca, although never an undisputed starter. He achieved top-flight promotion in his first season, then proceeded to make roughly over 100 overall appearances.

Subsequently, Carreras had similar experiences with both Atlético Madrid and Deportivo Alavés. after featuring regularly in both clubs' promotion from the Segunda División, he saw very little time in the following campaigns; in between, he spent 2003–04 with Real Murcia also in the top division.

Carreras' career would end on a sour note: when playing for the Basque side, he clashed with eccentric owner/chairman/manager Dmitry Piterman. Teammate Roberto Bonano, who stepped up in his defense, was also suspended; both retired shortly afterwards.

Coaching career
After retiring, Carreras returned to his last club to have his first head coaching experience in 2009, with the reserves in Tercera División. In his debut campaign at the helm of CE Sabadell FC, he led the team to promotion to the second tier after 18 years.

On 30 May 2013, after avoiding relegation for the second time in a row, Carreras resigned amid rumors he could sign for a top team in the same league. It finally happened on 26 February of the following year when he was appointed at the helm of RCD Mallorca, replacing the fired José Luis Oltra.

Carreras was relieved of his duties on 20 May 2014, after winning only ten points out of 36. On 27 December 2015 he was named Real Zaragoza manager but, after failing to reach the play-off positions with a 6–2 loss at already relegated UE Llagostera in the last matchday of the season, he resigned.

On 21 June 2017, Carreras signed a two-year contract with another second division club, Gimnàstic de Tarragona. After just four league games (one draw and three losses), he was sacked.

Carreras was hired by a foreign club for the first time in December 2018, when Japan's Sagan Tosu named him as manager for the upcoming season; they had recently secured the high-profile transfer of his former Atlético teammate Fernando Torres. He resigned the following 5 May, with the team last-placed having scored just once in their first ten J1 League matches.

Managerial statistics

Honours

Club
Barcelona
La Liga: 1992–93

Mallorca
Supercopa de España: 1998

International
Spain U21
UEFA European Under-21 Championship third place: 1994

References

External links

FC Barcelona profile

1972 births
Living people
People from Maresme
Sportspeople from the Province of Barcelona
Spanish footballers
Footballers from Catalonia
Association football defenders
Association football utility players
La Liga players
Segunda División players
Segunda División B players
Tercera División players
FC Barcelona C players
FC Barcelona Atlètic players
FC Barcelona players
Real Oviedo players
Racing de Santander players
RCD Mallorca players
Atlético Madrid footballers
Real Murcia players
Deportivo Alavés players
Spain youth international footballers
Spain under-21 international footballers
Catalonia international footballers
Spanish football managers
Segunda División managers
Segunda División B managers
CE Sabadell FC managers
RCD Mallorca managers
Real Zaragoza managers
Gimnàstic de Tarragona managers
J1 League managers
Sagan Tosu managers
Spanish expatriate football managers
Expatriate football managers in Japan
Spanish expatriate sportspeople in Japan